Bill Gaylord (born 4 April 1967 in Lakenheath, Suffolk) is a British former alpine skier who competed in the 1992 Winter Olympics and in the 1994 Winter Olympics.

References

1967 births
Living people
British male alpine skiers
Olympic alpine skiers of Great Britain
Alpine skiers at the 1992 Winter Olympics
Alpine skiers at the 1994 Winter Olympics
Sportspeople from Suffolk